Cipocereus is a genus of cacti from Brazil. These species were previously included in the genera Pilosocereus and Cereus.

Species

Synonymy
The genus Floribunda F.Ritter has been brought into synonymy with this genus.

References 

Cactoideae
Cactoideae genera